Michael Jay Johnson (August 8, 1944 – July 25, 2017) was an American pop, country, and folk singer-songwriter and guitarist. He is best remembered for his 1978 hit song "Bluer Than Blue". He charted four hits on the Billboard Hot 100 chart and nine more on Hot Country Songs, including two number one country hits in 1986's "Give Me Wings" and "The Moon Is Still Over Her Shoulder". He also co-wrote "Cain's Blood", the debut single of 1990s country group 4 Runner.

Career

Johnson was born in the small town of Alamosa, Colorado and grew up in Denver. He started playing the guitar at 13. In 1963, he began attending Colorado State College (now the University of Northern Colorado) in Greeley to study music but his college career was truncated when he won an international talent contest two years later. First prize included a deal with Epic Records.

Wishing to hone his instrumental skills, in 1966 he set off for Barcelona, Spain, to the Liceu Conservatory, studying with the eminent classical guitarists, Graciano Tarragó and Renata Tarragó. Upon his return to the States, he joined Randy Sparks in a group called the New Society and did a tour of the Orient.

When the band dissolved in 1967, he signed on with the Chad Mitchell Trio for a year, spending some of that time co-writing with another member, John Denver. The group was renamed Denver, Boise & Johnson. When the trio came to an end, Johnson made a radical departure from everything he had done previously by taking on a major supporting role in the off-Broadway production of Jacques Brel Is Alive and Well and Living in Paris.

In 1971, Johnson signed with Atco Records to release his first album, There Is A Breeze, which was released in 1973 and produced by Johnson, Chris Dedrick, Peter Yarrow and Phil Ramone in New York and Toronto, Canada. Feeling this first effort was not a true reflection of his music (despite being a best seller in the Minneapolis-St. Paul area), Johnson self-produced his next LP in 1975, For All You Mad Musicians, relying more on his voice and guitar for a folk feel. He followed this up with Ain't Dis Da Life, where he added a rhythm section. With each new recording and his continued touring, his popularity was increasing.

Teaming up with Brent Maher and Steve Gibson in Nashville, Tennessee, Johnson created a two-song demo consisting of "Bluer Than Blue" and "Almost Like Being in Love" (the latter song from the Broadway musical Brigadoon). EMI America took one listen and wasted no time in signing him, quickly getting The Michael Johnson Album out in 1978. "Bluer Than Blue" was written by Randy Goodrum. The first single, "Bluer Than Blue", became Johnson's first Top 40 hit, peaking at No. 12 on the Billboard Hot 100 chart in the summer of 1978; the song became a chart-topping single on the Adult Contemporary chart. "Almost Like Being in Love" went to No. 91 on the R&B chart while hitting the Top 5 on the AC chart and the Top 40 on the pop chart. 

Johnson recorded five albums in all for EMI and in 1985 moved over to RCA Records, where he adopted a contemporary country style that stayed compatible with his soft, mellow leanings. He scored five Top Ten country hits from 1986 to 1989, including the chart-toppers "Give Me Wings" and "The Moon Is Still Over Her Shoulder." After two country albums on RCA (plus two greatest hits collections), Johnson moved over to Atlantic Records in 1991.

In 1995, the country music group 4 Runner scored a minor hit with the single "Cain's Blood", for which Johnson co-wrote an updated version with Jack Sundrud of Poco.

Death
Johnson died at his home in Minneapolis, Minnesota, on July 25, 2017, 2 weeks short of his 73rd birthday.

Discography

Albums

Singles

Featured singles

Music videos

References

External links

1944 births
2017 deaths
People from Alamosa, Colorado
American male singer-songwriters
American country guitarists
American folk guitarists
American male guitarists
American soft rock musicians
American country singer-songwriters
Singers from Denver
Colorado State University alumni
Guitarists from Colorado
20th-century American guitarists
Atco Records artists
EMI Records artists
RCA Records artists
Vanguard Records artists
Atlantic Records artists
Red House Records artists
20th-century American male musicians
Singer-songwriters from Colorado